Carolinas Medical Center (CMC) is an 874-bed non-profit, tertiary, research and academic medical center located in Charlotte, North Carolina, servicing the southern North Carolina, northern South Carolina, and the Metrolina region. Carolinas Medical Center is one of the region's only academic university-level teaching centers. The hospital is the flagship hospital of Atrium Health. Carolinas Medical Center is affiliated with the Wake Forest School of Medicine. Carolinas Medical Center is also an ACS designated level I trauma center and has a heliport to handle medevac patients. Attached to the medical center is the Levine Children's Hospital, treating infants, children, adolescents, and young adults.

History 
The hospital was organized in 1940 as Charlotte Memorial Hospital on Blythe Boulevard in the Dilworth neighborhood.  Since that time, the hospital has undergone several major expansions, bringing the licensed bed capacity to 874 beds.

In May 1970, the organ Transplant program began with the first cadaveric kidney transplant performed by Dr. Don Mullen and Dr. Dale Ensor.   This was one of the first transplants in the USA done outside a medical school setting.  A year later, Mullen and Ensor performed the first living related transplant.

Dr. Francis Robicsek performed the first heart transplant at Carolinas Medical Center in 1986.

In 2007, the multistory Levine Children's Hospital was completed and opened, making it the second largest children's hospital in the Southeastern United States, after Washington, D.C.

In 2010, the University of North Carolina School of Medicine established the Charlotte Campus of the UNC School of Medicine at Carolinas Medical Center. Students from UNC School of Medicine had been completing clinical rotations at Carolinas Medical Center for over 40 years prior.

On July 28, 2011, Becker's Hospital Review listed Carolinas Medical Center under 60 Hospitals with Great Orthopedic Programs.

In October 2020, Wake Forest School of Medicine and Atrium Health began an agreement to make Carolinas Medical Center one of its flagship teaching hospitals along with the creation of a Charlotte campus of its medical school.

Today, Carolinas Medical Center is the region's only Level 1 Trauma Center and part of Atrium Health, one of the largest public not-for-profit healthcare systems in the United States.

References

External links 
 Carolinas Medical Center
 Original Charlotte Memorial Hospital in 1940
 Charlotte Memorial Hospital in 1972

Atrium Health
Hospitals in Charlotte, North Carolina
Hospitals in North Carolina
Trauma centers
Public hospitals in the United States